Stig Lönnqvist (born 12 April 1949) is a Finnish sprinter. He competed in the 4 × 400 metres relay at the 1972 Summer Olympics and the 1976 Summer Olympics.

References

1949 births
Living people
Athletes (track and field) at the 1972 Summer Olympics
Athletes (track and field) at the 1976 Summer Olympics
Finnish male sprinters
Olympic athletes of Finland
Place of birth missing (living people)